Varun Vinod Chakravarthy (born 29 August 1991) is an Indian cricketer who plays for Tamil Nadu in domestic cricket and Kolkata Knight Riders in the Indian Premier League (IPL) as a leg spin bowler. He made his international debut for the India cricket team in July 2021. He has 31 wickets in 41 matches.

Early life
Chakravarthy was born on 29 August 1991 in Bidar, Karnataka. He did his schooling in Chennai, at Kendriya Vidyalaya CLRI and then St. Patrick's Anglo Indian Higher Secondary School, where he played cricket. He obtained a bachelor's degree in architecture from SRM University. At age 25, he gave up his job as an architect to pursue cricket professionally.

Career
He made his List A debut for Tamil Nadu in the 2018–19 Vijay Hazare Trophy on 20 September 2018. He was the leading wicket-taker for Tamil Nadu in the 2018–19 Vijay Hazare Trophy, with twenty-two dismissals in nine matches. He made his first-class debut for Tamil Nadu in the 2018–19 Ranji Trophy on 12 November 2018.

In December 2018, he was bought by the Kings XI Punjab in the player auction for the 2019 Indian Premier League (IPL) at the price of 8.4 crores. He made his Twenty20 debut for the team on 27 March 2019. His first over went for 25 runs, the highest number of runs conceded by a bowler on debut in the IPL. He was released by the Kings XI Punjab ahead of the 2020 IPL auction. In the 2020 IPL auction, he was bought by the Kolkata Knight Riders ahead of the 2020 Indian Premier League. On 24 October 2020, he took his first five-wicket haul in the IPL, with figures of 5 wickets for 20 runs, against the Delhi Capitals in Abu Dhabi. He was Kolkata Knight Riders' highest wicket-taker in the 2021 IPL tournament.

In October 2020, he was named in India's Twenty20 International (T20I) squad for their series against Australia. However, on 9 November 2020, Chakravarthy was ruled out of the squad after suffering an injury. In February 2021, he was named in India's T20I squad for their series against England.

In June 2021, he was named in India's One Day International (ODI) and T20I squads for their series against Sri Lanka. He made his T20I debut on 25 July 2021, for India against Sri Lanka, taking the wicket of Dasun Shanaka. In September 2021, Chakravarthy was named in India's squad for the 2021 ICC Men's T20 World Cup.

Personal life
Chakravarthy also made a cameo appearance in the 2014 Indian Tamil-language sports drama film Jeeva as a club cricketer. On 11 December 2020, he married his longtime girlfriend Neha Khedekar in a closed ceremony in Chennai.

On 3 May 2021, Chakravarthy, along with his Kolkata Knight Riders teammate Sandeep Warrier, tested positive for COVID-19. As a result, the match between Kolkata Knight Riders and Royal Challengers Bangalore was called off. Ultimately, the tournament was suspended.

References

External links
 

1991 births
Living people
Indian cricketers
India Twenty20 International cricketers
Indian male actors
Tamil male actors
Male actors in Tamil cinema
21st-century Tamil male actors
Indian architects
Punjab Kings cricketers
Kolkata Knight Riders cricketers
Tamil Nadu cricketers
People from Bidar